Events from 1688 in the Kingdom of Scotland

Incumbents
 Monarch – James VII (until 11 December)
 Secretary of State – John Drummond, 1st Earl of Melfort

Events
 August – Battle of Maol Ruadh fought between the Chattan Confederation led by the Clan Mackintosh against the Clan MacDonald of Keppoch and the Clan Cameron.
 Kirk of the Canongate in Edinburgh established.

Births
 April – John Boyle, 2nd Earl of Glasgow, nobleman (died 1740)

Deaths
 19 January – Sir James Foulis, 2nd Baronet
 17 February – James Renwick, minister and the last of the Covenanter martyrs.

See also
 Timeline of Scottish history

References

 
1680s in Scotland